Nabumetone is a nonsteroidal anti-inflammatory drug (NSAID). Nabumetone was developed by Beecham and first received regulatory approval in 1991.  It is available under numerous brand names, such as Relafen, Relifex, and Gambaran.

Nabumetone is a nonacidic NSAID prodrug that is rapidly metabolized in the liver to the active metabolite, 6-methoxy-2-naphthyl acetic acid. As found with previous NSAIDs, nabumetone's active metabolite inhibits the cyclooxygenase enzyme and preferentially blocks COX-2 activity (which is indirectly responsible for the production of inflammation and pain during arthritis). The active metabolite of nabumetone is felt to be the compound primarily responsible for therapeutic effect. Comparatively, the parent drug is a poor inhibitor of COX-2 byproducts, particularly prostaglandins. It may be less nephrotoxic than indomethacin. There are two known polymorphs of the compound.

Nabumetone has little effect on renal prostaglandin secretion and less of an association with heart failure than other traditional drugs of the class. Effects of nabumetone on blood pressure control in hypertensive patients on ACE inhibitors are also good, equivalent to paracetamol.

Medical uses
Similar in action to other NSAIDs, Nabumetone is used to treat pain and inflammation.

Side effects
It has been shown to have a slightly lower risk of gastrointestinal side effects than most other nonselective NSAIDs, since it is a non-acidic prodrug that is  metabolized to its active 6-MNA (6-methoxy-2-naphthylacetic acid) form.

Side effects include bloody or black, tarry stools; change in color, frequency, or amount of urine; chest pain; shortness of breath; coughing up blood; pale stools; numbness; weakness; flu-like symptoms; leg pain; vision problems; speech problems; problems walking; weight gain; stomach pain; cold sweat; skin rash; blisters; headache; swelling; bleeding; bruising; vomiting blood; jaundice; diarrhea; constipation; dizziness; indigestion; gas; nausea; and ringing in the ears.

In October 2020, the U.S. Food and Drug Administration (FDA) required the drug label to be updated for all nonsteroidal anti-inflammatory medications to describe the risk of kidney problems in unborn babies that result in low amniotic fluid. They recommend avoiding NSAIDs in pregnant women at 20 weeks or later in pregnancy.

References

Nonsteroidal anti-inflammatory drugs
Prodrugs
Naphthol ethers
Ketones